Ernest Hilaire is a Saint Lucian politician who is Deputy Prime Minister and Minister for Tourism, Investment, Creative Industries, Culture and Information. Hilaire also serves as the 1st Deputy Political Leader of the Saint Lucia Labour Party. Hilaire serves in the House of Assembly as the representative for Castries South. Hilaire is the former High Commissioner to the United Kingdom for Saint Lucia. He served in opposition from 2016 till the landslide victory of the Saint Lucia Labour Party in the 2021 general election.

Education 
In the 1990s Hilaire obtained a Bachelor of Science degree at the Cave Hill campus of the University of the West Indies. Hilaire made the decision to move from a strictly Sociology major to a double major in Political Science and Sociology. Hilaire served one year as a Foreign Service Cadet and went on to achieve his Master of Philosophy Degree in 1995 with a distinction in International Relations from Darwin College, Cambridge University, England. Hilaire also obtained a PhD from London School of Economics in 2006 with a thesis titled International relations and the shaping of state-societal relations - A postcolonial study.

Post career 
Hilaire served as the Permanent Secretary in the Ministry of Youth and Sports in 1999. Hilaire became the Chief Executive Officer of The West Indies Cricket Board (WICB) on 1 October 2009. He would later leave the post to obtain a diplomatic posting in London in September 2012.

References

External links 
Ernest Hilaire profile at the Saint Lucia Labour Party's website.
Ernest Hilaire Website.

Alumni of Darwin College, Cambridge
Alumni of the London School of Economics
Ambassadors of Saint Lucia
Ambassadors to the United Kingdom
Living people
Members of the House of Assembly of Saint Lucia
Deputy Prime Ministers of Saint Lucia
Saint Lucia Labour Party politicians
University of the West Indies alumni
Year of birth missing (living people)